Tefereth Israel Anshei Parksville Synagogue is a historic synagogue on Dead End Street in Parksville, Sullivan County, New York. It was constructed in about 1907 and is a -story, wood-frame building on a deep stone building and built into the side of a hill.  It is topped by a gable roof and features a small wooden entrance portico with a hipped roof.

It was added to the National Register of Historic Places in 1999.

References 

Synagogues in Sullivan County, New York
National Register of Historic Places in Sullivan County, New York
Synagogues on the National Register of Historic Places in New York (state)
Synagogues completed in 1907
1907 establishments in New York (state)